Florentino Asensio Barroso (16 October 1877 – 9 August 1936) was a Spanish Roman Catholic who served as the Apostolic Administrator of the Diocese of Barbastro. He served as a chaplain of both the Little Sisters of the Poor and the Servants of Jesus as a priest. He was elevated into the episcopate in 1935 and was killed in 1936 during the onslaught of the Spanish Civil War.

His appointment as administrator was opposed and he was soon captured and tortured. It was in mid 1936 that he was shot to death. He was willing to sacrifice - in that moment - his own blood for the faith.

He was beatified in 1997 after it was determined that he was indeed killed in hatred of the faith.

Life
Florentino Asensio Barroso was born on 16 October 1877 in Valladolid to poor parents. He made his First Communion on 1 May 1887. He originally wanted to become a member of the Order of Saint Augustine, indeed he made his first vows in 1888 but he was discouraged to continue and so was directed instead to the diocesan seminary.

He commenced his studies for the priesthood and received the minor orders in 1889. He was ordained to the sub-diaconate on 22 September 1900 and the diaconate on 22 December 1900, and was ordained as a priest on 1 June 1901 by the Auxiliary Bishop of Valladolid. He graduated with a doctorate in theology from the Pontifical University of Valladolid and then went on to teach there for a brief period of time.

He served as a pastor in Villaverde de Medina until 1902 when he was transferred to Valladolid. It was there that he became the personal assistant to Archbishop Macho - later cardinal. From 1902 until 1917 he served as the confessor to the seminary in Valladolid. He also served as the confessor to various congregations and monasteries from 1920 until 1935. In 1925 he was tasked teaching catechism to adults.

He was well regarded for his pastoral zeal in dealing with the sick and the poor; in 1935 the Apostolic Nuncio to Spain Federico Tedeschini informed Pope Pius XI that Barroso would be a suitable choice to become a bishop and to act as the Apostolic Administrator of Barbastro. He received episcopal consecration in 1936 and took possession of the see by proxy on 8 March 1936.

Barroso was arrested in the episcopal residence and was imprisoned on 22 July 1936 during the onslaught of the Spanish Civil War. On the night of 8 August he was taken to solitary confinement in Barbastro and was interrogated to the point of cutting off his genitals. On 9 August, he was shot to death three times in the temple. Along with other killed detainees, his body was taken to a cemetery in a truck and was thrown into a mass grave at around 2:00am. After the war concluded, his remains were easily identified based on the initials that marked his undergarments. He was given an autopsy on 16 April 1993.

Beatification
The beatification process commenced under Pope Pius XII in Barbastro on 20 May 1947, granting him the posthumous title Servant of God. The local process saw the accumulation of witness testimonies in addition to all documents that supported the fact that he was killed in hatred of the faith. The process concluded on 30 April 1952, and was ratified on 4 October 1991 in order for the cause to proceed.

The Positio was submitted to the Congregation for the Causes of Saints in Rome in 1993 and his martyrdom was approved on 31 January 1997. This allowed for Pope John Paul II to celebrate his beatification on 4 May 1997.

References

External links
Hagiography Circle
Saints SQPN
Catholic Hierarchy 

1877 births
1936 deaths
19th-century venerated Christians
20th-century venerated Christians
Spanish beatified people
Beatifications by Pope John Paul II
People from Valladolid
Martyrs of the Spanish Civil War
Martyred Roman Catholic priests
Assassinated religious leaders
Deaths by firearm in Spain
Martyred Roman Catholic bishops
Violence against men in Europe